The 1997 EA-Generali Ladies Linz was a women's tennis tournament played on indoor hard courts at the Intersport Arena in Linz in Austria that was part of Tier III of the 1997 WTA Tour. The tournament was held from February 3 through February 9, 1997. Chanda Rubin won the singles title.

Finals

Singles

 Chanda Rubin defeated  Karina Habšudová 6–4, 6–2
 It was Rubin's only title of the year and the 8th of her career.

Doubles

 Alexandra Fusai /  Nathalie Tauziat defeated  Eva Melicharová /  Helena Vildová 4–6, 6–3, 6–1
 It was Fusai's 1st title of the year and the 2nd of her career. It was Tauziat's 1st title of the year and the 16th of her career.

References

External links
 ITF tournament edition details

EA-Generali Ladies Linz
Linz Open
EA-Generali Ladies Linz
EA-Generali Ladies Linz
Generali